Lachlan Hansen (born 17 August 1988) is a former professional Australian rules footballer who played for the North Melbourne Football Club in the Australian Football League (AFL).

AFL career
Hansen was drafted by North Melbourne with pick three in the 2006 AFL draft. Prior to the 2006 AFL draft, Hansen was widely seen as one of the top key position players for his age group, and was expected to be selected by the Kangaroos in the number three spot.

After three games in his debut year (2007), including a final against Hawthorn, Hansen was hampered by injury in the early part of 2008. He made it back into the team for North Melbourne in the round 13 clash against Hawthorn and remained in the team for the remainder of the home and away season. He was a late withdrawal, however, in the final against  due to the inclement weather.

Hansen played the first five matches of the 2009 season before suffering a severe hamstring tear in round 5 against Richmond. He missed the next six weeks. During his absence, Nathan Grima cemented a spot in the side, and upon his return, Hansen was played up forward to address a hole in the team. He kicked three goals in the round 19 clash against Melbourne at Etihad Stadium.

Hansen began the 2010 season in defence. He went onto kicking 23 goals, including five against  and four against  in consecutive weeks, in addition to kicking four against . His contested marking, a feature of his pre-draft days, was a highlight in 2010 at either end of the ground. Hansen cemented a spot in the team's 22 for the majority of the year.

Despite patches of form and frustration through 2011 and 2012, Hansen was a regular in the North Melbourne line-up. An injury in the 2012 pre-season along with a suspension in the Victorian Football League (VFL) saw his return to the side delayed until the second half of the season. He played in the forward line and kicked five goals from the first four games in 2013 before missing two weeks with a medial knee injury. He came straight back into the side in round 7, however, he played in the back line. Since his move back, he polled well in the coaches votes, earning votes in four games including a stand-out performance against  in round 15. He suffered a concussion in the first minutes of the round 16 game against the Brisbane Lions and was subbed off. He finished eighth in the Syd Barker Medal. He led North Melbourne in general marking and was one of the league's best in respect to intercept marks. He also used his endurance to great effect as a loose man in defence on many occasions, setting up scoring opportunities.

2014 was a mixed season for Hansen, where he was limited to 18 games due to a chronic hip injury. He finished the season third in total marks at North Melbourne despite missing seven games.

Following surgery on both hips, a long rehabilitation followed, including doing no running until mid-January 2015. This meant a delayed start to the season before returning against Richmond in round 6 at Hobart in which he recorded 12 possessions and 11 marks before sitting out the last quarter. Against Essendon in round 7, he recorded 24 possessions and 14 marks with five intercept marks. Hansen spent the 2016 season evenly between the AFL and VFL, while missing some time recovering from a concussion. Hansen played five games at AFL level including the side's elimination final loss.

In October 2017, he was delisted by North Melbourne when they informed him he would not receive a new contract for the 2018 season.

References

External links

1988 births
Living people
North Melbourne Football Club players
Australian rules footballers from Melbourne
Gippsland Power players
Werribee Football Club players